Amberoderma beali is a species of beetles in the family Dermestidae, the only species in the genus Amberoderma.

References

Dermestidae genera
Monotypic Bostrichiformia genera